Mandla Emmanuel Dlamini is a South African politician from the African National Congress. He was the party's Western Cape spokesperson.

See also 

 List of National Assembly members of the 27th Parliament of South Africa

References 

Living people
Year of birth missing (living people)
Place of birth missing (living people)
Members of the National Assembly of South Africa
African National Congress politicians
21st-century South African politicians